Nasser Abdulhadi (Arabic:ناصر عبد الهادي) (born 16 December 1989) is an Emirati footballer. He currently plays as a midfielder for Ajman on loan from Ittihad Kalba .

References

External links
 

Emirati footballers
1989 births
Living people
Emirates Club players
Ajman Club players
Dibba FC players
Al Wahda FC players
Al-Ittihad Kalba SC players
UAE First Division League players
UAE Pro League players
Association football midfielders